Hannah Bell (born 9 August 1969) is a Canadian politician who has served as a member of the Legislative Assembly of Prince Edward Island since 13 December 2017. She represents the electoral district of Charlottetown-Belvedere as a member of the Green Party of Prince Edward Island.

Career
Prior to entering provincial politics, she was the executive director of the PEI Business Women's Association (founded in 1994) for five years. Previously, she had been an employee of Veterans Affairs Canada.

Electoral record

References

External links 

Living people
People from Charlottetown
Green Party of Prince Edward Island MLAs
Women MLAs in Prince Edward Island
21st-century Canadian politicians
1969 births
21st-century Canadian women politicians